Bob Northover is a male British former sports shooter.

Sports shooting career
Northover represented England and won a gold medal in the centre fire pistol and a silver medal in the centre fire pistol pairs with Michael Cutler, at the 1986 Commonwealth Games in Edinburgh, Scotland.

References

Living people
British male sport shooters
Shooters at the 1986 Commonwealth Games
Commonwealth Games medallists in shooting
Commonwealth Games gold medallists for England
Commonwealth Games silver medallists for England
Year of birth missing (living people)
20th-century British people
Medallists at the 1986 Commonwealth Games